Diana Carolina Corcho Mejía (born April 13, 1983) is a Colombian doctor, psychiatrist and political scientist. She is the Minister of Health and Social Protection since August 7, 2022.

Early life 
Corcho is the daughter of professor and engineer Freddy Hernán Corcho of the National University and deputy to the Antioquia Assembly and of the engineer and former mayor of Zaragoza (Antioquia), Amparo Mejía.

Corcho studied medicine at the University of Antioquia and psychiatry at the National University of Colombia. She completed a master's degree in political studies at the Pontifical Bolivarian University.

Career 

Corcho was president of the South Latin American Corporation, a Civil Society organization that deals with various public policy matters, on agrarian, economic, social, health, and human rights issues, (2018 - 2022). Vice President of the Colombian Medical Federation (2018 - 2022), instance of the medical union, permanent adviser to the National Government on public health and education policies in the sector. Co-founder and member of the Network of Progressive Women of Latin America, scenario of political parties and civil society organizations of the PAOLA group of Latin America, Olof Palme International Center, (2022).

Member of the Follow-up Commission of Judgment T-760 for a Structural Reform of the Health System. Consultant civil society body of the Constitutional Court on Public Health Policy, 2022.

She was part of the coordination of the promotion committee of the Social and Political Summit for the Structural Reform of the Health System, convergence between various academic, scientific, civil society and political sectors for the debate and discussion of a proposal for structural reform of the health system that develops the statutory law 1751 of 2015, (2021-2022)

Member of the Great National Medical Board. Body in which the Presidents of medical unions at the national level, co-authors of Statutory Law 1751 of 2015, converge.

Member of the National Mental Health Council, Advisory body of the National Government in matters of Mental Health public policy, on behalf of medical unions and scientific societies, 2017.

PAHO Consultant - Ministry of Health and Social Protection in piloting for the implementation of a syringe exchange model in the heroin consuming population in Colombia (2014).

Through her work at the ANIR, where she served as president, she fought to save the San Juan de Dios Hospital and call for the statutory health law. After these events, she gained notoriety and caught the attention of the then mayor of Bogotá Gustavo Petro who appointed her as director of Social Participation in the Bogotá Ministry of Health between 2014 and 2016.

Notes

References

External links 

|-

{{s-ttl|rows=2|title=Order of precedence of Colombia|years=since August 7, 2022}}

1983 births
Living people
Cabinet of Gustavo Petro
Government ministers of Colombia
Women government ministers of Colombia
21st-century Colombian politicians
21st-century Colombian women politicians
Pontifical Xavierian University alumni
Universidad Externado de Colombia alumni